Bonnyrigg railway station was a railway station that served the town of Bonnyrigg, Midlothian, Scotland from 1855 to 1965 on the Peebles Railway.

History 
The station opened on 1 August 1855 by the Peebles Railway. It was situated on the south side of Dundas Street on the B704. The station's name was changed to Bonnyrigg Road in December 1866 to avoid confusion, but it was changed back to Bonnyrigg on 1 August 1868 due to more confusion being caused. Originally, the goods yard had one siding but in the early 20th century a second siding was added which served a cattle dock and a goods shed was added. A third siding ran end on to the dock. Polton Colliery was to the south of the station and opened in the mid 19th century. It was served by Polton number 2 colliery siding. The station was closed to passengers on 10 September 1962 but the goods yard remained open, which means that the station was downgraded to an unstaffed public deliver siding. The goods yard was closed on 25 January 1965.

References

External links 

Disused railway stations in Midlothian
Former North British Railway stations
Railway stations in Great Britain opened in 1855
Railway stations in Great Britain closed in 1962
1855 establishments in Scotland
1965 disestablishments in Scotland
Bonnyrigg and Lasswade